Balado is a type of hot and spicy bumbu (spice mixture) found in Minang cuisine of West Sumatra, Indonesia It has since spread through the rest of Indonesia and also Malaysia especially in Negeri Sembilan. Balado sauce is made by stir frying ground red hot chili pepper with other spices including garlic, shallot, tomato and kaffir lime (leaves, fruit, or both) in coconut or palm oil.

The ingredients are quite similar to sambal hot chili paste. However, unlike sambal—which is often treated as a separate dipping condiment, balado chili sauce is usually mixed and stir fried together with its main ingredients and treated as a dish. Balado is suitable for fried prawns, squid, fish (whole or cutlets), chicken, fried boiled eggs, fried beef, eggplant or potatoes.

Because of its almost identical ingredients and technique, the term balado is often interchangeable with sambal goreng (lit.: "fried sambal"). Nevertheless, the term balado is more specifically referring to Minang cooking tradition, while sambal goreng refers to a more general Indonesian cuisine tradition.

Variants
In the Minang dialect the term balado literally means "with chili" or "in chili", since lado means "chili pepper" in the Minang dialect (compared with the Indonesian word "berlada"). Dish names usually combine the main ingredient followed with "balado", for example:
 Ayam balado (chicken balado)
 Bada balado (anchovies balado)
 Baluik balado or belut balado (eel balado)
 Cumi balado (squid balado)
 Dendeng balado (dendeng balado, thinly sliced dry fried beef)
 Kantang balado or kentang balado (potato balado)
 Talua balado or telur balado (egg balado)
 Taruang balado (eggplant balado)
 Teri Kacang Balado or Peanuts Anchovy Balado.
 Tuna balado (tuna balado)
 Udang balado (prawn/shrimp balado)
 Sambalado or sambal balado (balado as sambal condiment), precooked balado sauce prepared early and refrigerated to be used later in cooking.

Gallery

In popular culture
Hot and spicy balado has become an inspiration for a popular dangdut song, "Sambalado", sung by Ayu Tingting.

See also

Cuisine of Indonesia
Sambal
Rica-rica
Dabu-dabu

References

External links
Indonesian Balado sauce recipe from SBS
Balado Sambal – Indonesian Chili Sambal (sauce) from Food Whirl
Egg balado recipe

Padang cuisine
Indonesian cuisine